Ranjhalli is a village panchayat near the river bank of Rushikulya and located at heart of the Ganjam district. It has population of nearly about 2,400 with 700 families (as per the 2011 census). Most residents are farmers and labourers.

History
From the very beginning this village has been established with only 2 streets named Kama Sahi & Bada Danda Sahi. And took year after year to expand. The main cause of expanding and establishment was its much fertilized land and availability of water for farming and cultivation. Due to well communication among nearby cities this Village came to front view of Purushottampur Block. And now it has been a major Grama Panchayat in this Block.

Geography
Located 35 km from The Berhampur Railway Station through Roadways. There's no alternative other than roadways. adjacent to SH32 and Rushikulya. Near by airport is  Biju Patnaik International Airport at Bhubaneswar at distance of 140 km away. Surrounded by few small Mountains as like Keshpur Mountain and The Famous Maa Tara Tarini Mountain at distance of 200meter & 2 km respectively. Number of men made water bodies were also present for daily use, Irrigation and for Fishing.

Major streets

Demographics
Most of the population were aged between 20–35 years. And 68% will be Female out of total. 60% will come under Scheduled Castes and Scheduled Tribes. Another 40% will be Brahmin General with some Other Backward Class

Recognized commercial firms
Peoples of this village have established some commercial firms. Such as many poultry, vegetable, and mushroom firms. There are three Petrol Pumps also, invested and managed by few residents. Coincidentally there was a Private Ayurveda Drug Manufacturing Unit also named Kalinga Ayurvedic Pharmacy. Link label

Schools
There is One Upper Primary School Under Sarva Shiksha Abhiyan established in 1953 providing education from standard 1 to 7 in Odia medium. The number of student will be about to 300.

There is also a high school named Beer Bajarang High Schoolunder Board of Secondary Education, Odisha from standard 8 to 10. The high school was opened in the year 1995 with only 35 students and 3 teachers. The class was commenced with in a single room of Panchayat office premises at preliminary stage. But nowadays this school is growing under State Government With a huge Capacity of 250 students out of which 143 students only in Class 10. This number of students is due to incoming children from near by villages.

But nowadays many children prefer to study at private nursing schools located in Purushottampur.

There is no college for higher studies since at a distance of 3 km only ene college is available.

The Grama Panchayat Ranjhalli
This panchayat consists of five villages 
 Mukundpur
 Keshpur
 Pichuli
 Hatapur
 Khosalpalli

Notable people
Notable people from this village include Mr. Shyam Sundar Padhi (former Director General of Odisha Police) and his wife Mrs. Amiya Padhi (the first lady judge of Honourable Odisha High Court); one of the historical persons who was a soldier in Burma from the British era named Shree Mohana Parida was also from this soil (he holds the record of living more than 100 years but documentary evidence of this is lacking).

Villages in Ganjam district